Christer Hult was a Swedish association football defender, playing for IFK Norrköping. He played 13 games for the Swedish national team.

References

IFK Norrköping players
Swedish footballers
Kalmar FF players
Living people
Sweden international footballers
Association football defenders
1946 births